The Gruber Prize in Neuroscience, established in 2004, is one of three international awards worth US$500,000 made by the Gruber Foundation, a non-profit organization based in Yale University in New Haven, Connecticut.

The Gruber Prize in Neuroscience winners are nominated by the Society for Neuroscience.

Recipients 
2004 Seymour Benzer
2005 Eric Knudsen and Masakazu Konishi
2006 Masao Ito and Roger Nicoll, cellular neurobiologists
2007 Shigetada Nakanishi a molecular neurobiologist, Director of the Osaka Bioscience Institute
2008 John O’Keefe, PhD, Professor of Cognitive Neuroscience at University College London
2009  Jeffrey C. Hall, professor of neurogenetics at the University of Maine; Michael Rosbash, professor and director of the National Center for Behavioral Genomics at Brandeis University; and Michael Young, professor and head of the Laboratory of Genetics at Rockefeller University
2010 Robert H. Wurtz, NIH Distinguished Investigator at the National Eye Institute Laboratory of Sensorimotor Research
2011 Huda Zoghbi
2012 Lily Jan and Yuh Nung Jan, University of California, San Francisco
2013 Eve Marder
2014 Thomas Jessell
2015 Carla Shatz and Michael Greenberg
2016 Mu-ming Poo, Institute of Neuroscience, Chinese Academy of Sciences and UC Berkeley
2017 Joshua R. Sanes, Center for Brain Neuroscience, Harvard University
2019 Joseph S. Takahashi
2020 Friedrich Bonhoeffer, Corey Goodman and Marc Tessier-Lavigne
2021 Christine Petit and Christopher A. Walsh
2022 Larry Abbott, Emery Neal Brown, Terrence Sejnowski and Haim Sompolinsky

See also 
 The Brain Prize
 Golden Brain Award
 The Kavli Prize in Neuroscience
 W. Alden Spencer Award
 Karl Spencer Lashley Award
 The Mind & Brain Prize
 List of medicine awards
 List of neuroscience awards

References

External links
 Gruber Foundation Web site
 Gruber Prizes nomination page
 Facebook page for The Peter and Patricia Gruber Foundation

Neuroscience awards
Awards established in 2000